Zeacumantus lutulentus is a species of medium-sized sea snail or mud snail, a marine gastropod mollusk in the family Potamididae, the horn snails.

Distribution 
This species occurs in:
 New Zealand
 Australia

References

 Ozawa, T., Köhler, F., Reid, D.G. & Glaubrecht, M. (2009). Tethyan relicts on continental coastlines of the northwestern Pacific Ocean and Australasia: molecular phylogeny and fossil record of batillariid gastropods (Caenogastropoda, Cerithioidea). Zoologica Scripta, 38: 503-525

External links 

 
 

Batillariidae
Gastropods of New Zealand
Gastropods described in 1841